Admiral Sir Frank Henry Edward Hopkins,  (23 June 1910 – 14 April 1990) was a senior officer in the Royal Navy.

Naval career
Educated at the Nautical College at Pangbourne in Berkshire, Hopkins joined the Royal Navy in 1927.

Hopkins served in the Second World War, initially on the staff of the naval observer school at Ford in Sussex. In 1940, he transferred to 826 Naval Air Squadron and then to RAF Coastal Command. Then in 1941, he took command of 830 Naval Air Squadron, sinking large quantities of German shipping in the Mediterranean. He went on to join the British Air Commission in Washington DC, before becoming an observer with the United States Pacific Fleet.

Hopkins also served in the Korean War as Air Commander in the aircraft-carrier . In 1960, he became Flag Officer, Flying Training, and in 1962 he was made Flag Officer, Aircraft Carriers.

Hopkins was appointed Deputy Chief of the Naval Staff and Fifth Sea Lord in 1963. He was one of the admirals who threatened to resign in protest over the decision by the Labour Secretary of State for Defence, Denis Healey, to cancel the CVA-01 aircraft carrier programme. His last role was as Commander-in-Chief, Portsmouth, in 1966; he retired in 1967.

Family
In 1933, Hopkins married Joan Mary Standring; they had one daughter. Following a divorce, he married Lois Barbara Cook in 1939; there were no children. Following the death of his second wife, he married Georgianna Priest in 1988.

References

|-

Royal Navy admirals
Lords of the Admiralty
Fleet Air Arm aviators
Companions of the Distinguished Service Order
Knights Commander of the Order of the Bath
1910 births
1990 deaths
People educated at Stubbington House School
Fleet Air Arm personnel of World War II
Royal Air Force personnel of World War II
Military personnel from Surrey